Augustus William (8 March 1662 – 23 March 1731), a member of the House of Welf, was Duke of Brunswick-Lüneburg and ruling Prince of Wolfenbüttel from 1714 until his death.

Life
Augustus William was the third, but eldest surviving son of Duke Anthony Ulrich and his consort Elizabeth Juliane, a daughter of Duke Frederick of Schleswig-Holstein-Sønderburg-Norburg. Unlike his father, the young prince was not interested in politics; he studied at the University of Geneva from 1677 to 1678 and afterwards went on a Grand Tour from Switzerland to France and the Netherlands.

Nevertheless, in 1681 his uncle, the ruling Prince Rudolph Augustus of Braunschweig-Wolfenbüttel, who himself had no male heirs, adopted him as crown prince. The agreement annoyed Augustus William's father and led to a growing estrangement between them. Moreover, his right of succession was contested by Rudolph Augustus' son-in-law Duke John Adolphus of Schleswig-Holstein-Sonderburg-Plön. The prince temporarily retired to Langeleben in the Elm hill range, where he had a hunting lodge erected, probably according to plans designed by Hermann Korb. Meanwhile, he also acted as a Wolfenbüttel envoy to the Brandenburg-Prussian, Swedish, and Danish courts. In 1690 he gave his consent to cede the Brunswick County of Blankenburg to his younger brother Louis Rudolph, thus violating the Welf primogeniture principle.

Augustus William succeeded his father as Prince of Wolfenbüttel in 1714. He had his Wolfenbüttel residence extended, but left political decisions to corrupt ministers. His splendid court severely burdened the public budget.

Even though he was married three times, he died childless in 1731 and was succeeded by his brother Louis Rudolph. Despite his marriages, he claimed to have been introduced to the "art" of homosexuality in Venice; later falling in love with Raugrave Karl Ludwig von der Pfalz, half-brother of Princess Elizabeth Charlotte.

Family
 In 1681, he married Christine Sophie (1654–1695), daughter of Rudolph Augustus, Duke of Brunswick-Lüneburg.
 In 1695, he married Sophie Amalie (1670–1710), daughter of Christian Albert, Duke of Holstein-Gottorp.
 In 1710, he married Elisabeth Sophie Marie (1683–1767), daughter of Prince Rudolph Frederick of Schleswig-Holstein-Sonderburg-Norburg (he was the son of Frederick, Duke of Schleswig-Holstein-Sønderburg-Norburg).

Ancestors

References

 Article in Zedler's Universal-Lexicon (in German)
 At the House of Welf site (in German)

Princes of Wolfenbüttel
1662 births
1731 deaths
German LGBT people
LGBT royalty
New House of Brunswick